Rémy Dugimont (born 1 July 1986) is a French professional footballer who plays as a striker for French club AJ Auxerre in the Ligue 2.

Career
Born in Saint-Cloud, Dugimont began his career with professional club Paris Saint-Germain. After three years at the club, Dugimont signed with amateur club Le Chesnay and later joined Levallois SC. He spent one season at the club before joining Poissy in the Championnat de France amateur 2 helping the club earn promotion to the fourth division. During the 2010–11 season, Dugimont's amateur career was covered extensively through a blog by French newspaper and website L'Equipe and its sister site France Football.

Dugimont scored the winning penalty for AJ Auxerre in the 2022 Ligue 1 relegation playoffs against Saint-Étienne, earning the team promotion to Ligue 1 for the first time since 2012.

Career statistics

References

External links
 
 Foot-National Profile

1986 births
Living people
Sportspeople from Saint-Cloud
French footballers
Footballers from Hauts-de-Seine
Association football forwards
Ligue 1 players
Ligue 2 players
Championnat National players
Championnat National 2 players
Championnat National 3 players
AS Poissy players
FC Rouen players
Clermont Foot players
AJ Auxerre players